Bruno Lodewijk Juliaan Ambrosius Valkeniers (born 13 June 1955) is a Flemish businessman, and since 2008 the party chairman of the political party Vlaams Belang.

Before entering active politics, Valkeniers worked in the maritime and port business for 26 years, as director of a global port operator and as the CEO of a maritime consulting company. He was elected member of the Antwerp provincial council in 2006, and member of the Belgian parliament in 2007. In 2008, he was chosen as new party chairman for the Vlaams Belang as the successor to Frank Vanhecke, having contested the position unopposed.

References

1955 births
Living people
Vlaams Belang politicians
University of Antwerp alumni
Vrije Universiteit Brussel alumni
21st-century Belgian politicians